Margaret Jean Snowling  (born 15 July 1955) is a British psychologist, and world-leading expert in language difficulties, including dyslexia. From 2012 to 2022 she was President of St John's College, Oxford and Professor in the Department of Experimental Psychology, University of Oxford. Snowling was appointed Commander of the Order of the British Empire (CBE) in 2016 for services to science and the understanding of dyslexia. She was born in South Shields.

Research interests 
Snowling's main research interests are in the development of language and literacy skills. In particular, her research looks at underlying causes of difficulties in language and literacy skills, and what interventions are effective in treating them. A central focus of her research is dyslexia, and the effect of oral language difficulties on educational attainment.

In addition, Snowling's research has considered the prominent role of women and mothers - in academia, advocacy movements and teaching - in provision for children with dyslexia and other special educational needs. Principally, this has been through her work on the history of dyslexia.

Snowling's work has been cited over 39,000 times.

Education 
Snowling was educated at state schools. She attended Mortimer Road Primary School and Cavendish School, Hemel Hempstead. Snowling completed her undergraduate studies at the University of Bristol in 1976. She was awarded her PhD from University College London in 1979. She qualified as a clinical psychologist in 1988.

She has been awarded honorary doctorates by Goldsmiths, University of London (2007), University College London (2014), the University of Warwick (2016), and the University of Bristol (2019).

Academic career 
Snowling was Lecturer, Senior Lecturer and Head of Department at National Hospitals College of Speech Sciences (1979-1992), Professor of Psychology and Head of Department at Newcastle University (1992-1994), and Professor of Psychology at the University of York (1994-2012).

She is Honorary Professor at the Centre for Evaluation and Monitoring, Durham University. Snowling was a member of the 2009 Rose Review of Dyslexia and Literacy Difficulties.

As President of St John's College, Oxford from 2012 to 2022, Snowling promoted the '2000 Women' programme, a series of events to celebrate the 2000 women matriculated at the College since 1979, when women were first admitted to the College. Snowling was significantly involved with policies and strategies to widen participation at the University of Oxford.

Awards 
Snowling's contributions to the study of dyslexia have been recognised with the Marion Welchman Award of the British Dyslexia Association in 1997, the British Psychological Society Presidents' Award in 2003, the Samuel T. Orton award of the International Dyslexia Association in 2005, and the Lady Radnor Prize of Dyslexia Action in 2013.

She is a fellow of the British Psychological Society (1992), Royal Society of Arts (2002), Academy of Medical Sciences (2008), and British Academy (2009). She was elected Academician of the Academy of Social Sciences in 2003.

Personal life 
Snowling is married to the psychologist, Charles Hulme.

Selected published works 

Dyslexia: A Very Short Introduction (2019). Oxford University Press

Developing Reading Comprehension (2013) (with PJ Clarke, E Truelove, C Hulme). Wiley-Blackwell

Developing Language and Literacy: Effective Intervention for Language and Literacy in the Early Years (2011) (with JM Carroll, C Bowyer-Crane, F Duff, C Hulme). Wiley-Blackwell

Developmental Disorders of Language, Learning and Cognition (with C Hulme). Wiley-Blackwell

Dyslexia (2nd edition) (2000). Blackwell

Dyslexia: A Cognitive-Developmental Perspective (1st edition) (1997). Blackwell

References

 

Presidents of St John's College, Oxford
British psychologists
Alumni of University College London
Fellows of the British Academy
Fellows of the Academy of Medical Sciences (United Kingdom)
Living people
1955 births
Commanders of the Order of the British Empire
Women academic administrators
British women psychiatrists
Dyslexia researchers
People from South Shields